Vivere is a 2019 Italian drama film directed by Francesca Archibugi.

The film premiered out of competition at the 76th Venice International Film Festival on 31 August 2019.

Cast
Micaela Ramazzotti as Susi
Adriano Giannini as Luca
Massimo Ghini as Marinoni
Marcello Fonte as Perind
Roisin O'Donovan as Mary Ann
Andrea Calligari as Pierpaolo
Elisa Miccoli as Lucilla
Valentina Cervi as Azzurra
Enrico Montesano as De Sanctis

Release
The film had its world premiere out of competition at the 76th Venice International Film Festival on 31 August 2019. It was released in Italy on 26 September 2019.

References

External links

2019 drama films
2019 films
Films directed by Francesca Archibugi
Italian drama films
2010s Italian-language films
2010s Italian films